Hussein Sultan Mesaud Al Idrissy (born 23 September 1985) is a Libyan former professional footballer who played as a midfielder, notably for ES Zarzis in the Tunisian Ligue Professionnelle 1.

References

External links
 

1985 births
Living people
People from Tripolitania
Libyan footballers
Association football midfielders
Aljazeera SC players
Al-Ahli SC (Tripoli) players
ES Zarzis players
Al-Ahly SC (Benghazi) players
Libyan Premier League players
Tunisian Ligue Professionnelle 1 players
Libyan expatriate footballers
Libyan expatriate sportspeople in Tunisia
Expatriate footballers in Tunisia